The afoxé is an Afro Brazilian musical instrument composed of a gourd (cabaça) wrapped in a net in which beads or small plastic balls are threaded. The instrument is shaken to produce its musical noise.

A similar instrument is the xequerê which is larger.

External links
 Xequerê and Afoxe images and description In Portuguese.

References 

Brazilian percussion
Gourd musical instruments
Idiophones
Unpitched percussion instruments